Greywood's Plot is a 2019 American horror film directed by Josh Stifter, starring Josh Stifter, Keith Radichel and Daniel Degnan.

Cast
 Josh Stifter as Dom
 Keith Radichel as Miles
 Daniel Degnan as Doug Greywood
 Nathan Strauss as Igor
 Kim Fagan as Dom's Mom
 Samantha Kirchoff as Marla
 Aaron McKenna as Aaron

Release
The film was released on digital on 16 September 2022.

Reception
Martin Unsworth of Starburst rated the film 4 stars out of 5 and wrote that while the film is not "wholly successful", it is " entertaining", is "clearly a labour of love" and has a "brilliant" twist.

John Noonan of FilmInk wrote that while the film "could do with a trim", it is " disarmingly interesting" and "will please those looking for something a bit different."

Film critic Kim Newman wrote that the film has "a small cast, imaginative use of woodland locations, an odd attitude and an unusual use of handcrafted animated inserts to add texture and strangeness."

References

External links
 
 

American horror films
2019 horror films